Gara is a village in Bács-Kiskun county, near Baja, in Hungary.

History
The village is first mentioned in a 1290 document. The name is derived from the Garai family name. The most commonly accepted theory claims that the word Gara originates from a Slavic word meaning hill. (The original village was situated on a small hill, at a distance of 4 kilometers from its current location.)

According to Turkish tax listings, the village had 25 houses under Ottoman rule. The original village was destroyed. After the Kingdom of Hungary regained its lost territories, Gara was rebuilt. In 1731, the village's population reached 277. In 1734, Germans settled the place. The first school there was opened in 1755 (by János Bary). In 1895, Gara was connected to the national railroad system. This line was closed in 1971 as traffic declined (the Treaty of Trianon had made this line unnecessary, and after fifty years, the train company decided to end service to Gara).

Demographics
Existing ethnicities:
  Magyars 
  Croats (from Bunjevci group)
  Germans

Notable persons from Gara 
Antun Karagić, Croatian writer 
Kricskovics Antal, Dancer, Choreographer

External links
A site about the village

Populated places in Bács-Kiskun County
Places in Bačka
Hungarian German communities